Haberdashers' Knights Academy (formerly Malory School and then Haberdashers' Aske's Knights Academy) is a secondary school with academy status located in the Downham area of the London Borough of Lewisham, England. Haberdashers' Knights Academy is part of the Haberdashers' Aske's Federation in south-east London.

References

External links 
Haberdashers’ Knights Academy Website
Geograph photo of the Primary School

Haberdashers' Schools
Academies in the London Borough of Lewisham
Secondary schools in the London Borough of Lewisham
Grove Park, Lewisham